Baia de Criș is a commune in Hunedoara County, Transylvania, Romania, close to the small town of Brad. It is composed of nine villages: Baia de Criș, Baldovin (Báldovin), Căraci (Karács), Cărăstău (Karasztó), Lunca (Lunka), Rișca (Riska), Rișculița (Riskulica), Țebea (Cebe) and Văleni.

The village of Țebea is where the Revolt of Horea, Cloșca and Crișan started in 1784, and marks the death place and burial site of Avram Iancu.

References

Communes in Hunedoara County
Localities in Transylvania
Mining communities in Romania